Parepare is a city (kota) in South Sulawesi, Indonesia, located on the southwest coast of Sulawesi, about  north of the provincial capital of Makassar. A port town, it is one of the major population centers of the Bugis people. The city had a population of 129,542 people at the 2010 Census and 151,454 at the 2020 Census.

Jusuf Habibie, the third President of Indonesia, was born in Parepare.

History
In the early development of this plateau, there was just a thicket of bushes which had many holes on slightly sloping land, which grew wild irregularly, ranging from the northern (Cappa Edge) up to the route south from the city. As the time goes by, those bushes have now become the city of Parepare.

At an early date, there were kingdoms located on Parepare - the kingdom of Suppa in the 14th century and Bacukiki Kingdom in the 15th century.

The term "Parepare" originates from the sentence of the King of Gowa “Bajiki Ni Pare” which means “(Ports in this region) are good.” Since then, the name “Parepare” has referred to the port city. Parepare was subsequently visited by Malay people who came to trade into the region of Suppa.

Seeing the strategic position of a harbour protected by a headland in the front side, the Dutch conquered this place at the first opportunity, and made it an important city in the territory of the central part of South Sulawesi.

At the time of the Dutch East Indies, in Parepare, there was a Resident Assistant and a Controlur or Gezag Hebber as Head of Government (the Dutch East Indies), while the status of the region is named the “Afdeling Parepare” which included five "Onder Afdeling" for Barru, Sidenreng Rappang, Enrekang, Pinrang and Parepare.

In each region, an Onder Afdeling Controlur was domiciled or a Gezag Hebber. Beside the Dutch East Indies government officials, the structure of the Dutch East Indies Government was also assisted by government officials and Bugis kings, namely Arung Barru in Barru, Addatuang Sidenreng in Sidenreng Rappang, Sporting Enrekang in Enrekang, Addatung Sawitto in Pinrang, while at Parepare there was Arung Mallusetasi.

This governance structure, up to the outbreak of World War II, that was when the Dutch East Indies Government was overtaken around the year 1942.

Administration 
Pare-Pare (city) is divided into four Districts (Kecamatan), tabulated below with their areas and their populations at the 2010 Census and the 2020 Census. The table also includes the location of the district administrative centres, and the number of administrative villages (urban kelurahan and rural desa) in each district.

Climate
Parepare has a tropical monsoon climate (Am) with moderate rainfall from June to October and heavy rainfall from November to May.

List of mayors

Here is a list of Mayors of Parepare since 1960:
Andi Mannaungi (1960–1965)
Andi Mappangara (1965–1968)
Andi Mallarangeng (1969–1972)
Abdullah Adjaib (1972–1973)
Parawansa (1973–1977)
Joesoef Madjid (1977–1983)
Andi Samad Thahir (1983–1988)
Mirdin Kasim (1988–1993)
Syamsul Alam Bulu (1993–1998)
Basrah Hafid (1998–2003)
Zain Katoe (2003–2010)
Sjamsu Alam (2010–2013)
Taufan Pawe (2013–2023)

Twin town 
  Tawau, Malaysia.

See also 
 List of reduplicated place names

References 

 http://indonesia-tourism.com/blog/parepare-city/

External links 
 Official Website
 Local News Website 
 Pondok Pesantren Al-Badar Parepare
 Provider Jaringan Internet RT/RW

Port cities and towns in Indonesia
Populated places in South Sulawesi
Cities in Indonesia